Vadym Vitaliiovych Chervak (born 27 May 1999) is a professional Ukrainian footballer who last played for Sparta Prague B as a defender.

Club career

MFK Zemplín Michalovce
Chervak made his professional Fortuna Liga debut for Zemplín Michalovce against Senica on 18 August 2019 in a 3:0 home victory. Chervak played the full match.

References

External links
 Profile at UAF website
 
 
 Futbalnet profile 

1999 births
Living people
People from Monastyryska
Ukrainian footballers
Association football defenders
Ukraine youth international footballers
FC Vorskla Poltava players
Ukrainian Premier League players
AC Sparta Prague players
FC Sellier & Bellot Vlašim players
Czech National Football League players
MFK Zemplín Michalovce players
Slovak Super Liga players
Expatriate footballers in the Czech Republic
Expatriate footballers in Slovakia
Ukrainian expatriate sportspeople in the Czech Republic
Ukrainian expatriate sportspeople in Slovakia